Zhakiyanov or Jaqianov (literally meaning "long-liver") is a Kazakh masculine surname. Its feminine counterpart is Zhakiyanova. 

Notable persons with the name Zhakiyanov include:
Galymzhan Zhakiyanov (born 1963), Kazakh businessman and politician
Zhanat Zhakiyanov (born 1983), Kazakh businessman and politician

Kazakh-language surnames